Yves Pons (born 7 May 1999) is a Haitian-born French professional basketball player for ASVEL of the LNB Pro A and the EuroLeague. He played college basketball for the Tennessee Volunteers.

Early life and career
Pons was born in Port-au-Prince, Haiti and spent three and a half years with his biological mom. He was born in Port-au-Prince, which is the capital, but his hometown was Cité Soleil. It’s one of the biggest areas in Haiti and is also the poorest part of Haiti. His mom, by law, had to send him to the orphanage because she couldn’t take care of him, and he was pretty sick at the time.

After close to a year in the orphanage, Yves was taken in by his adopted parents, Babeth and Jean-Claude Pons, who lived in France. Pons attended French sports institute INSEP, in Paris, and played for its affiliated club Centre Fédéral de Basket-ball in the Nationale Masculine 1 (NM1), the amateur third-tier division of French basketball.

Recruiting
Pons decided to play college basketball in the United States for Tennessee under head coach Rick Barnes, after being recruited by assistant coach Michael Schwartz. He chose the Volunteers over offers from Florida and Texas Tech. He became the first four-star recruit to play for Barnes at Tennessee and the first French men's basketball player in school history.

College career

Pons suffered an ankle injury in his Tennessee debut, a win over Presbyterian, and was limited to four minutes. In his freshman season, he played 24 games off the bench and averaged 5.2 minutes per game. As a sophomore, Pons scored a season-high 10 points against Eastern Kentucky in his first career start. In February 2019, Pons suffered a facial fracture in a collision in practice and underwent a corrective procedure. Pons averaged 2.2 points per game as a sophomore, but put in a lot of work on his game after the season. He saw considerable improvement as a junior, scoring a career-high 15 points in his season debut versus UNC Asheville and eclipsing that mark in his next game after scoring 19 versus Murray State. At the conclusion of the regular season, Pons was named SEC Defensive Player of the Year. As a junior, Pons averaged 10.8 points, 5.4 rebounds, and 1.1 assists per game. Following the season, he declared for the 2020 NBA draft. On August 3, Pons announced he was returning to Tennessee for his senior season.

Professional career

Memphis Grizzlies (2021–2022) 
After going undrafted in the 2021 NBA draft, Pons joined the Memphis Grizzlies for the 2021 NBA Summer League. On August 10, 2021, he signed an Exhibit 10 contract with the Grizzlies, which was subsequently turned into a two-way contract. Under the terms of the deal, he split time with the Grizzlies and their NBA G League affiliate, the Memphis Hustle. Pons was transferred to the Hustle on January 30, 2022. On February 6, he was ruled out due to a thigh injury, and missed several games.

ASVEL (2022–present) 
Pons joined the Brooklyn Nets for the 2022 NBA Summer League. On July 26, 2022, Pons signed a two-year contract with ASVEL Basket.

National team career
Pons won a gold medal with France at the 2014 FIBA Europe Under-16 Championship in Latvia, after averaging 3.8 points per game. He averaged 10.1 points, 4.1 rebounds, and 1.3 blocks per game at the 2016 FIBA Under-17 World Championship in Zaragoza, Spain, as his team finished in sixth place. In 2019, Pons joined France at the FIBA U20 European Championship in Tel Aviv, Israel, where he averaged 2.6 points per game for the fourth-place team.

Career statistics

NBA

|-
| style="text-align:left;"| 
| style="text-align:left;"| Memphis
| 12 || 0 || 5.9 || .313 || .333 || .000 || 1.0 || .1 || .1 || .3 || 1.1
|- class="sortbottom"
| style="text-align:center;" colspan="2"| Career
| 12 || 0 || 5.9 || .313 || .333 || .000 || 1.0 || .1 || .1 || .3 || 1.1

College

|-
| style="text-align:left;"| 2017–18
| style="text-align:left;"| Tennessee
| 24 || 0 || 5.2 || .500 || .667 || .500 || .6 || .2 || .1 || .1 || .7
|-
| style="text-align:left;"| 2018–19
| style="text-align:left;"| Tennessee
| 35 || 13 || 11.7 || .516 || .280 || .400 || 1.8 || .5 || .3 || .4 || 2.2
|-
| style="text-align:left;"| 2019–20
| style="text-align:left;"| Tennessee
| 31 || 31 || 33.9 || .489 || .349 || .638 || 5.4 || 1.1 || .4 || 2.4 || 10.8
|-
| style="text-align:left;"| 2020–21
| style="text-align:left;"| Tennessee
| 26 || 26 || 28.5 || .466 || .274 || .789 || 5.3 || .7 || .7 || 1.8 || 8.7
|- class="sortbottom"
| style="text-align:center;" colspan="2"| Career
| 116 || 70 || 20.1 || .484 || .318 || .653 || 3.3 || .6 || .4 || 1.2 || 5.7

References

External links
Tennessee Volunteers bio

Living people
1999 births
ASVEL Basket players
Black French sportspeople
Centre Fédéral de Basket-ball players
French expatriate basketball people in the United States
French men's basketball players
French sportspeople of Haitian descent
Memphis Grizzlies players
Memphis Hustle players
National Basketball Association players from France
Power forwards (basketball)
Shooting guards
Small forwards
Sportspeople from Bouches-du-Rhône
Sportspeople from Port-au-Prince
Tennessee Volunteers basketball players
Undrafted National Basketball Association players